Waisea Sedre Luveniyali (born Suva, 23 July 1985) is a Fijian rugby union footballer. He hails from the village of Kasavu in the province of Naitasiri, and his mother is from the village of Qarani, Gau in the Lomaiviti group.

Career
He plays as a fly-half, formerly for Fiji Warriors.

Luveniyali was a late call up to the Fijian team in 2007 after playing for Fiji in the Under 21 World Cup. The young fly half was put right into the starting lineup to debut against Australia A, where they drew the game 14 – 14. After this performance, he was selected for the Fiji for the 2007 Rugby World Cup finals. He played against Australia (12–55). He had 2 caps, with a conversion and a penalty scored by the end of the tournament.

He was the first choice fly-half for Fiji in the 2008 IRB Pacific Nations Cup and played in the 2009 IRB Pacific Nations Cup.

Harlequins
On 29 July 2008, Harlequins confirmed that he had arrived in London to join up with his new team and had started training.

External links
 Harlequins profile
 Fiji profile
 Scrum profile

1985 births
Living people
Fijian rugby union players
Rugby union fly-halves
Fiji international rugby union players
Fijian expatriate rugby union players
Expatriate rugby union players in New Zealand
Expatriate rugby union players in England
Fijian expatriate sportspeople in New Zealand
Fijian expatriate sportspeople in England
Crusaders (rugby union) players
Harlequin F.C. players
Sportspeople from Suva
People from Naitasiri Province
People from Gau Island
I-Taukei Fijian people